Christopher Morgan Klucsarits (January 4, 1970 – April 2, 2010) was an American professional wrestler. He was best known for his appearances with World Championship Wrestling (WCW) and the World Wrestling Federation (WWF) from 1994 to 2004, under the ring names Chris Kanyon, Kanyon, and Mortis. He was given the nickname "The Innovator of Offense" during his career, and has been recognized by commentators as one of the most underrated stars of WCW.

Early life
As a youth, Kanyon played roller hockey, basketball, and baseball at school. He attended Archbishop Molloy High School in Queens, graduating in 1988. In 1992 he graduated from the University at Buffalo with a bachelor's degree in physical therapy. During his time there, he was a member of the Mad Turtles, the University at Buffalo Rugby Football Club. Kanyon worked full-time as a physical therapist for three years before becoming a wrestler.

Professional wrestling career

Early career (1992–1995)
After college, he began training under Pete McKay Gonzalez, Ismael Gerena and Bobby Bold Eagle at the Lower East Side Wrestling Gym in Manhattan at some point between December 1991 and January 1992. He wrestled his first match on April 5, 1992, in Levittown, New York at the Island Trees Junior High School, and wrestled one match as Chris Morgan before adopting the ring name Chris Canyon and later changed it to Chris Kanyon. Kanyon worked as a physical therapist for the next three years, wrestling on weekends and in the evenings, before finally deciding to become a full-time professional wrestler in 1995. Early in his career, Kanyon formed a tag team with Billy Kidman which saw both men wrestle in hockey uniforms.

In late 1994, he made several appearances with the World Wrestling Federation as a jobber, facing wrestlers such as Shawn Michaels, Diesel, Tatanka and Bob Holly. His friend and future manager James Mitchell saw potential in him and sent him for training with The Fabulous Moolah in South Carolina and with Afa at Wild Samoan wrestling School.

World Championship Wrestling (1995–2001)

Men at Work (1995–1996)
Kanyon debuted in World Championship Wrestling (WCW) as a jobber. He did win one upset victory over Disco Inferno on a Saturday Night taping. After several months he was placed with Mark Starr in a tag team called "Men at Work". Their gimmick was that they were two construction workers turned wrestlers who wore jeans to the ring, and that Kanyon would cause the team to suffer losses by taking measurements with his tape measure at inopportune times. Kanyon was replaced with Mike Winner before the team disbanded altogether.

Mortis and The Flock (1996–1998)

In 1996, Kanyon donned a mask and was repackaged as Mortis, a Latin word meaning death. Managed by James Vandenberg, Kanyon feuded with Glacier. Kanyon faced Glacier at Uncensored on March 16 in his pay-per-view debut but lost to the undefeated Glacier. Following the match, Wrath debuted, siding with Kanyon and assaulting Glacier. Glacier defeated Kanyon in a second match at Slamboree on May 18. After the match, Wrath and Mortis once again attacked Glacier. However, Glacier was spared a post-match beating when Ernest Miller ran to the ring to defend him. The four men fought one another over the following weeks, culminating in a match at Bash at the Beach on July 13 which was won by Mortis and Wrath. Mortis and Wrath continued to team together until the angle was quietly dropped in early 1998.

In February 1998, Kanyon (still in his guise as Mortis) asked Raven if he could join Raven's stable The Flock but was told that he could only become a member if he defeated Diamond Dallas Page for the United States Heavyweight Championship. Mortis failed to defeat Page for the title on the February 12 episode of Thunder, and he was DDT'ed on the entrance ramp by Raven as a result. This event led to Kanyon discarding the "Mortis" persona and beginning a feud with Raven, in the course of which he was dubbed "The Innovator of Offense" by play-by-play commentator Mike Tenay due to his unique wrestling technique, which included multiple moves performed from a fireman's carry position. His matches almost always began with him asking the rhetorical question, "Who Better than Kanyon"? as the crowd would respond, "Everybody" (or "Nobody", if he was a face.) He formed an uneasy alliance with Perry Saturn in order to fight against The Flock, but eventually turned on Saturn and joined forces with Raven. After Saturn forced The Flock to disband by defeating Raven at Fall Brawl, Kanyon and Raven continued to team together until Raven, in storyline, was sidelined with depression and Kanyon took time away from his wrestling career to work as stunt coordinator and stuntman on The Jesse Ventura Story.

Teaming and feuding with Diamond Dallas Page (1999–2001)

Kanyon returned in 1999, helping Raven and Saturn win the World Tag Team Championship, but soon abandoned them and formed a stable with Bam Bam Bigelow and Diamond Dallas Page known as the Jersey Triad. The Triad feuded with Saturn and Chris Benoit over the Tag Team Championship, defeating them for the title on June 13 in the Baltimore Arena at The Great American Bash pay-per-view. During their reign, they were given special dispensation by WCW President Ric Flair to defend the title as a three-man unit, granting them a numerical advantage over their opponents. However, the ruling was overturned by Flair's replacement Sting, and Kanyon and Bigelow lost the title to Harlem Heat at Road Wild on August 14, 1999. The Triad disbanded shortly thereafter, with Kanyon once again placing his wrestling career on hiatus to work on the WCW produced film Ready to Rumble, where he served as stunt coordinator and as the stunt double of lead actor Oliver Platt.

Kanyon returned to WCW in late 1999 as Chris "Champagne" Kanyon, abbreviated to C.C.K., accompanied by J. Biggs, his "agent", and two former Nitro Girls, Baby and Chameleon. He claimed that he had become acclimatised to the glamor of Hollywood and thus began indulging in luxuries such as champagne, women, and expensive cars. He feuded briefly with Bigelow and Page before being removed from WCW by interim booker Kevin Sullivan.

Kanyon returned to WCW once more on April 10, 2000, when Vince Russo replaced Sullivan. He teamed with Page for several months, which climaxed at Slamboree with him attempting to save DDP from being powerbombed by Mike Awesome on top of the triple cage which was also used in the Ready to Rumble movie. Kanyon saved Page, but Awesome turned his attention to Kanyon, throwing him off the triple cage onto the ramp below, ending the pay-per-view in dramatic fashion. Kanyon, after a storyline which saw him in a halo brace in a hospital and in a wheelchair, stepped out of the wheelchair and turned on Page at The Great American Bash costing him his Ambulance match against Mike Awesome. Kanyon then joined Eric Bischoff, the leader of the New Blood faction. In the course of his renewed feud with Page, Kanyon began imitating Page, renaming himself "Positively" Kanyon (a reference to Page's autobiography, Positively Page) and wearing a long blonde wig. He eventually dyed his hair blonde and wore a "P.C.K." (Positively Chris Kanyon) T-shirt. In the course of the feud he began using a version of Page's finishing move, the Diamond Cutter, known as the Kanyon Kutter. He began arbitrarily delivering the Kutter to various WCW backstage employees, and at one point executed the move on Gene Okerlund and Buff Bagwell's mother Judy, leading to a short feud with the Bagwell family, which led to Buff Bagwell defeating Kanyon at New Blood Rising in a Judy Bagwell on a Forklift match. Kanyon left WCW shortly afterward.

Kanyon returned to WCW on the February 5, 2001 episode of Nitro attacking Diamond Dallas Page renewing his feud with Page. Kanyon returned to the ring and defeated Page at SuperBrawl Revenge on February 18, 2001, but Page defeated Kanyon in a rematch the following night on Nitro. Kanyon began feuding with Ernest "The Cat" Miller in March 2001. During this time he had a small gimmick change including a more intense look, new entrance music and a black leather jacket he wore to the ring. The feud had not been resolved by the time WCW was purchased by the World Wrestling Federation in late March 2001.

World Wrestling Federation/Entertainment (2001–2004)

WCW Invasion/The Alliance (2001)
On July 5, 2001, Kanyon made his WWF debut on SmackDown! as part of The Alliance, a group of former WCW wrestlers who were "invading" the WWF. He made his WWF pay-per-view debut at InVasion, a one-off show featuring WWF superstars against former WCW and ECW employees. At this show, he formed a team with Shawn Stasiak and Hugh Morrus in a winning effort against The Big Show, Billy Gunn and Albert in a six-man tag team match. On the July 26 episode of SmackDown!, in the Mellon Arena in Pittsburgh, WCW Champion Booker T, at the request of Stephanie McMahon, gave Kanyon his WCW United States Championship. Upon being presented with the title, Kanyon began referring to himself as "The Alliance MVP". on the August 2 episode of Smackdown, Kanyon retained the title against Kane by disqualification.

Kanyon reformed his tag team with fellow Alliance member Diamond Dallas Page on the August 6, 2001 edition of Raw when Kanyon helped Page attack The Undertaker backstage. On the August 9, 2001 episode of SmackDown!, they defeated the Acolytes Protection Agency (Faarooq and Bradshaw) for the WWF Tag Team Championship. Their reign lasted until August 19, when they were defeated by The Brothers of Destruction (Kane and The Undertaker) for the title in a steel cage match at SummerSlam. on the September 1 episode of WWF Jakked/Metal, Kanyon defeated Essa Rios to retain the title. Kanyon went on to lose the WCW United States Championship to Tajiri on the September 10, 2001 episode of Raw.

Kanyon then had a small feud with Matt Hardy over Kanyon hitting on Lita. Kanyon pinned Hardy on the September 24, 2001 edition of Raw. The feud eventually ended in early October after the Hardy Boyz defeated Kanyon and multiple Alliance partners, such as Rhyno, Lance Storm, Chuck Palumbo and Hugh Morrus, in a series of tag team matches. Kanyon then began working on the WWF's B-shows.

Brand switches (2001–2004)
On October 29, 2001, Kanyon tore his left anterior cruciate ligament during a dark match with Randy Orton. He underwent surgery with Dr. James Andrews in Birmingham, Alabama and was sidelined for the remainder of the Invasion angle. He would appear only once in a cameo role at the Survivor Series pay-per-view. At this show, a team representing the Alliance took on a team representing the WWF in a tag team match. A pre-match stipulation declared that the side represented by the losing team would all be released from their contracts (excluding title holders and the winner of the immunity battle royal, Test). As a result of the Alliance team's loss, Kanyon was "fired" along with all the other Alliance members. Eventually, all Alliance members returned as WWF superstars, usually quietly without a storyline or announcement. This storyline allowed Kanyon time to recover from injury. In May 2002, Kanyon was cleared to compete and was sent to Ohio Valley Wrestling, a WWE developmental territory, through the end of the month to restore himself to full fitness. However, while wrestling Lance Cade in Lima, Ohio on July 13, 2002 Kanyon injured his left shoulder, suffering a humeral head contusion and supraspinatus tendinitis. He underwent surgery on July 21, 2002 but began experiencing breathing difficulties on July 25, 2002. As a result of an allergy to the medications with which he was being treated, Kanyon's lungs filled with fluid and his blood oxygen level fell to 41%. He gradually recovered and was discharged from the hospital on July 28, 2002 having lost 32 lb (15 kg) in the interim.

Kanyon returned to OVW in October 2002 and remained there for a further four months, while continuing working dark matches before Raw and SmackDown! throughout late 2002 and early 2003. He made one appearance in a backstage segment with the APA, where they wanted him to attend a battle royal at the next pay-per-view event. Kanyon was among the challengers, but was largely inactive. On the February 13, 2003 episode of SmackDown! he returned to the main roster, emerging from a large crate, from The Big Show, dressed as Boy George and singing the 1983 Culture Club hit "Do You Really Want to Hurt Me" to The Undertaker, prompting the latter to attack Kanyon and concussing him with a hard chair shot. Kanyon made his televised in-ring return on the April 19, 2003 edition of Velocity with his "Who Betta Than Kanyon?" gimmick and was defeated by Rhyno. Despite a few appearances on SmackDown!, Kanyon was relegated to Velocity from that point on for the rest of 2003, in addition to wrestling on several dark matches and house shows as Mortis. On February 9, 2004, after a year of facing two injuries and not being used in any major storylines, Kanyon was officially released from his contract.

Later career (2004–2010)
Kanyon retired from professional wrestling on August 28, 2004, after losing a retirement match to Diamond Dallas Page in Wayne, New Jersey. In July 2005, he announced the end of his retirement and his imminent return to the independent circuit. In the aftermath of Hurricane Katrina in August 2005, he took part in several benefit shows.

Kanyon appeared at the Total Nonstop Action Wrestling pay-per-view Turning Point on December 11, 2005, as Larry Zbyszko's choice, Chris K, losing to Raven. Kanyon also appeared in Pro Wrestling Guerrilla taking on PWG champion, Joey Ryan. Joey retained the title with the help of someone wearing a Mortis outfit, distracting Kanyon.

Kanyon announced his second retirement on April 5, 2007.

He came out of retirement on December 19, 2009 for New York Wrestling Connection's Miracle On 57th Street defeating Alex Reynolds by disqualification. He continued working for the promotion before his death. He wrestled his last match on January 30, 2010 as Mortis in a handicap match defeating Blake Morris and Mike Reed.

Personal life
Kanyon appeared on the CNN special Death Grip: Inside Pro Wrestling, in November 2007 following the aftermath of the Chris Benoit double-murder and suicide. On the program, Kanyon stated that on September 14, 2003, he had taken 50 sleeping pills in a suicide attempt.

In the early hours of October 16, 2004, he was arrested in Ybor City, Tampa, Florida for "disorderly conduct and resisting arrest without violence" after attempting to break up a fight. He was released that same day after fellow wrestler Luke Hawx provided a US$750 cash bond. Kanyon publicly stated he did nothing wrong, and the case was thrown out of court.

Kanyon, along with Raven and Michael Sanders, attempted to sue WWE for "cheating them out of health care and other benefits" but a federal judge in Stamford, Connecticut, dismissed the case.

In 2004, after Kanyon's release from jail, he began what was thought to be a gimmick in which he was an openly gay wrestler. This included an occasion in which he stated that WWE released him from his contract because of his sexuality. Kanyon later told reporters and radio personalities that this was just a publicity stunt, but later retracted those statements and acknowledged that he was, in fact, gay. Before his death Kanyon was working on a book, Wrestling Reality, with Ryan Clark. The book was released November 1, 2011, and it details Kanyon's struggles as a closeted gay man.

On September 23, 2021, Viceland pro wrestling Canadian docuseries Dark Side of the Ring aired an episode focusing on Kanyon's career as well as his struggles with his personal life.

Death
Kanyon had been suffering from bipolar disorder, and he threatened suicide in the weeks prior to his death. On April 2, 2010, his brother Ken Klucsarits, concerned about him not answering calls, found him dead in his Sunnyside, Queens, apartment. An empty bottle of antidepressants and the drug Seroquel were found nearby. He was 40 years old. Kanyon left behind a note of apology for his family. His death was acknowledged by WWE.

Championships and accomplishments
Pro Wrestling Illustrated
Ranked No. 108  of the top 500 singles wrestlers in the PWI 500 in 1998
World Championship Wrestling
WCW World Tag Team Championship (2 times) – with Diamond Dallas Page and Bam Bam Bigelow
World Wrestling Federation
WCW United States Championship (1 time)
WWF Tag Team Championship (1 time) – with Diamond Dallas Page
Victory Championship Wrestling
VCW Hall of Fame (Class of 2018)

See also

 List of premature professional wrestling deaths

Notes

References

External links

1970 births
2010 suicides
20th-century professional wrestlers
21st-century professional wrestlers
American male professional wrestlers
American stunt performers
Archbishop Molloy High School alumni
Drug-related suicides in New York City
Gay sportsmen
LGBT people from New York (state)
LGBT professional wrestlers
American LGBT sportspeople
Masked wrestlers
NWA/WCW/WWE United States Heavyweight Champions
People with bipolar disorder
Professional wrestlers from New York City
Sportspeople from Queens, New York
University at Buffalo alumni
People from Sunnyside, Queens
Suicides in New York City
WCW World Tag Team Champions